Terry G. Swanson (born January 8, 1944) is a former American football punter who played for the Boston Patriots and the Cincinnati Bengals of the American Football League (AFL). He played college football at University of Massachusetts Amherst.

References 

1944 births
Living people
Sportspeople from Cambridge, Massachusetts
Players of American football from Massachusetts
American football punters
UMass Minutemen football players
Boston Patriots players
Cincinnati Bengals players
Belmont High School (Massachusetts) alumni